The 2022 Asian Junior and Cadet Table Tennis Championships were held in Vientiane, Laos, from 1 to 6 September 2022. It was organised by the Lao Table Tennis Federation under the authority of Asian Table Tennis Union (ATTU).

Medal summary

Events

Medal table

See also

2022 ITTF World Youth Championships
Asian Table Tennis Union

References

Asian Junior and Cadet Table Tennis Championships
Asian Junior and Cadet Table Tennis Championships
Asian Junior and Cadet Table Tennis Championships 
Asian Junior and Cadet Table Tennis Championships
Table tennis in Mongolia
International sports competitions hosted by Mongolia
Asian Junior and Cadet Table Tennis Championships